Firetalk was an always-on interactive video platform that allowed content creators to engage with and monetize their audiences.

History
Firetalk was created in 1997 by Multitude Communications in South San Francisco. The product, Firetalk, had its birth in a program that Multitude created called FireTeam. FireTeam was a multi-user game played over the internet. The game received good reviews, with the most favorable review highlighting the VoIP feature that FireTeam used so that users could communicate and plan over the internet. It was at that time that Multitude decided to branch off and create a program strictly for VoIP called Firetalk and Multitude adopted a "DBA" as Firetalk.

Four years later, Firetalk announced that it would need to shut down. Despite claiming to have 2 million users, it had only a few thousand paid subscribers. Firetalk's web site address, firetalk.com, was later bought by Paltalk.

In 2015, Firetalk briefly relaunched as an always-on live-streaming platform for content creators.

References

Online chat